Thomson Family Farm is a historic farm complex and national historic district located at New Kingston in Delaware County, New York. The district contains two contributing buildings, five contributing sites, and two contributing structures.  It includes the farmhouse dating to 1835-1840; dairy barn; horse barn, wood shop, and sheep barn foundations; granary site; and water power system.

It was listed on the National Register of Historic Places in 2004.

See also
National Register of Historic Places listings in Delaware County, New York

References

National Register of Historic Places in Delaware County, New York
Historic districts on the National Register of Historic Places in New York (state)
Historic districts in Delaware County, New York
Farms on the National Register of Historic Places in New York (state)